In the field of mathematical analysis, an interpolation inequality is an inequality of the form

The vector spaces concerned are usually function spaces, and many interpolation inequalities assume  and so bound the norm of an element in one space with a combination norms in other spaces, such as Ladyzhenskaya's inequality and the Gagliardo-Nirenberg interpolation inequality, both given below. Nonetheless, some important interpolation inequalities involve distinct elements , including Hölder's Inequality and Young's inequality for convolutions which are also presented below.

Applications 
The main applications of interpolation inequalities lie in fields of study, such as partial differential equations, where various function spaces are used. An important are the Sobolev spaces, consisting of functions whose weak derivatives up to some (not necessarily integer) order lie in Lp spaces for some p. There interpolation inequalities are used, roughly speaking, to bound derivatives of some order with a combination of derivatives of other orders. They can also be used to bound products, convolutions, and other combinations of functions, often with some flexibility in the choice of function space. Interpolation inequalities are also applied when working with Besov spaces , which are a generalization of the Sobolev spaces. Another class of space admitting interpolation inequalities are the Hölder spaces.

Examples 
A simple example of an interpolation inequality — one in which all the uk are the same u, but the norms ‖·‖k are different — is Ladyzhenskaya's inequality for functions u: ℝ2 → ℝ, which states that whenever u is a compactly supported function such that both u and its gradient ∇u are square integrable, it follows that the fourth power of u is integrable and

i.e.

A slightly weaker form of Ladyzhenskaya's inequality applies in dimension 3, and Ladyzhenskaya's inequality is actually a special case of a general result that subsumes many of the interpolation inequalities involving Sobolev spaces, the Gagliardo-Nirenberg interpolation inequality.

The following example, this one allowing interpolation of non-integer Sobolev spaces, is also a special case of the Gagliardo-Nirenberg interpolation inequality.

An example of an interpolation inequality where the elements differ is Young's inequality for convolutions.

Examples of interpolation inequalities

 Agmon's inequality
 Gagliardo–Nirenberg interpolation inequality
 Ladyzhenskaya's inequality
 Landau–Kolmogorov inequality
 Marcinkiewicz interpolation theorem
 Nash's inequality
 Riesz–Thorin theorem
 Young's inequality for convolutions

References

Inequalities
Sobolev spaces